Michael Haydn's Symphony No. 7 in E major, Perger 5, Sherman 7, MH 65, written in Salzburg in 1764, is one of the few symphonies in E major written in the 18th century, and was the first of four symphonies in the key to be mistaken for a symphony by Joseph Haydn (Hob. I:E1).

Scored for 2 oboes (the first of these switching to flute for the slow movement), 2 bassoons, 2 horns and strings, in three movements:

Allegro
Andantino, in A major
Allegro

Discography

Included in a set of 20 symphonies on the CPO label with Bohdan Warchal conducting the Slovak Philharmonic.

References
 A. Delarte, "A Quick Overview Of The Instrumental Music Of Michael Haydn" Bob's Poetry Magazine November 2006: 17 PDF
 Charles H. Sherman and T. Donley Thomas, Johann Michael Haydn (1737 - 1806), a chronological thematic catalogue of his works. Stuyvesant, New York: Pendragon Press (1993)
 C. Sherman, "Johann Michael Haydn" in The Symphony: Salzburg, Part 2 London: Garland Publishing (1982): lxiv

Symphony 07
1764 compositions
Compositions in E major